Orthocomotis shuara is a species of moth of the family Tortricidae. It is found in Morona-Santiago Province, Ecuador.

The wingspan is 20 mm. The ground colour of the forewings is cream, suffused with pale brownish orange and brownish. The hindwings are dark brown.

Etymology
The species is named for the Shuar people who live in the region around Macas.

References

Moths described in 2007
Orthocomotis